Saint-M'Hervon (Gallo: Saent-Mervon) is a former commune in the Ille-et-Vilaine department in Brittany in northwestern France. On 1 January 2019, it was merged into the commune Montauban-de-Bretagne.

Population
Inhabitants of Saint-M'Hervon are called saint-m'hervonais in French.

See also
Communes of the Ille-et-Vilaine department

References

External links

Official website 

Former communes of Ille-et-Vilaine